The 1978 Italian Open was a combined men's and women's tennis tournament that was played by men on outdoor clay courts at the Foro Italico in Rome, Italy. The men's tournament was part of the 1978 Colgate-Palmolive Grand Prix while the women's tournament was part of the Colgate International Series (Category A). It was the 35th edition of the tournament and was held from 22 May through 28 May 1978. The singles titles were won by first-seeded Björn Borg, who won his second Italian Open title after 1974, and third-seeded Regina Maršíková.

Finals

Men's singles
 Björn Borg defeated  Adriano Panatta 1–6, 6–3, 6–1, 4–6, 6–3
 It was Borg's 5th singles title of the year and the 35th of his career.

Women's singles
 Regina Maršíková defeated  Virginia Ruzici 7–5, 7–5

Men's doubles
 Víctor Pecci /  Belus Prajoux defeated  Jan Kodeš /  Tomáš Šmíd 6–7, 7–6, 6–1

Women's doubles
 Mima Jaušovec /  Virginia Ruzici defeated  Florența Mihai /  Betsy Nagelsen 6–2, 2–6, 7–6

Prize money

Source: World of Tennis 1979

References

External links
 WTA – Women's singles draw 
 WTA – Women's doubles draw 
 ITF – men's tournament edition details
 ITF – women's tournament edition details

Italian Open
Italian Open
Italian Open (tennis)
Italian Open (tennis)
Italian Open
1978 Italian Open (tennis)